Otogopterus (meaning "Otog Banner wing") is a genus of pterosaur in the family Ctenochasmatidae, known from Early Cretaceous rocks in the Ordos region of Inner Mongolia, China (Luohandong Formation). It contains one species, O. haoae, named in 2020 by Ji Shu'an and Zhang Lifu. The generic name Otogopterus refers to the Otog Banner locality, where it was discovered, while the specific name haoae honours palaeontologist Hao Yinchun. O. haoae is known from a partial lower jaw (the mandibular symphysis), which is long and straight, and bears a ridge on each side that divides the outer surface of the jaw. After Ordosipterus, Otogopterus is the second pterosaur known from the Ordos region.

References

Cretaceous pterosaurs of Asia
Cretaceous China
Fossils of China
Fossil taxa described in 2020
Ctenochasmatoids